Ibrahim ibn Adham also called Ibrahim Balkhi; c. 718 – c. 782 / AH c. 100 – c. 165 is one of the most prominent of the early ascetic Sufi saints.

The story of his conversion is one of the most celebrated in Sufi legend, as that of a prince renouncing his throne and choosing asceticism closely echoing the legend of Gautama Buddha. Sufi tradition ascribes to Ibrahim countless acts of righteousness, and his humble lifestyle, which contrasted sharply with his early life as the king of Balkh (itself an earlier centre of Buddhism). As recounted by Abu Nu'aym, Ibrahim emphasised the importance of stillness and meditation for asceticism. Rumi extensively described the legend of Ibrahim in his Masnavi. The most famous of Ibrahim's students is Shaqiq al-Balkhi (d. 810).

Life
According to Indian-Sufi Muslim Traditions Ibrahim's family was from Kufa in modern-day Iraq. He was born in Balkh (modern day Afghanistan). Most prominent sources and writers traced his lineage back to 'Abdullah, the brother of Ja'far al-Sadiq, son of Muhammad al-Baqir, and the great-great-grandson of Husayn ibn Ali. According to a few historians he was descended from the Islamic Caliph  Omar.

Accounts of Ibrahim's life are recorded by medieval authors such as Ibn Asakir and  Bukhari.

Ibrahim was born into the Arab community of Balkh as the king of the area in around 730 CE, but he abandoned the throne to become an ascetic.He received a warning from God, through Khidr who appeared to him twice, and, abdicated his throne to take up the ascetic life in Syria. Having migrated in around 750 CE, he chose to live the rest of his life in a semi-nomadic lifestyle, often travelling as far south as Gaza. Ibrahim abhorred begging and worked tirelessly for his livelihood, often grinding corn or tending orchards. In addition, he is also said to have engaged in military operations on the border with Byzantium, and his untimely death is supposed to have occurred on one of his naval expeditions.

His earliest spiritual master was a Christian monk named Simeon. Ibrahim later recounted his dialogue with Simeon in his writings:I visited him in his cell, and said to him, "Father Simeon, how long hast thou been here?" "For seventy years", he answered. "What is thy food?" I asked. "O Hanifite", he countered, "what hast caused thee to ask this?" "I wanted to know", I replied. Then he said. "Every night one chickpea." I said, "What stirs thee in thy heart so that this pea suffices thee?" He answered, "They come to me one day in every year and adorn my cell and process about it, so doing me reverence; and whenever my spirit wearies of worship, I remind it of that hour, and endure the labors of a year for the sake of an hour. Do thou, O Hanifite, endure the labor of a year for the glory of eternity." According to the records of the Chishti Order of Sufis, he is among their early masters and was also taught for some time by Fudhail Bin Iyadh.
 
As is often with the graves of saints, numerous locations have been placed as the burial place of Ibrahim ibn Adham. Ibn Asakir stated that Ebrahim was buried on a Byzantine island, while other sources state his tomb is in Tyre, in Baghdad, in the "city of the prophet Lot", in the "cave of Jeremiah" in Jerusalem and, in the city of Jablah (on the Syrian coast) where a mosque bearing his name is located (35.3626975, 35.9244253). But also in the city of Sur in the sultanate of Oman where a small shrine is a place of pelgrimage (22.5528326, 59.5295567).

Historicity and literary reception
The medieval narratives of the life of Ibrahim are semi-historical. Ibrahim may have been a historical Sufi of the 8th century, whose legend was embellished in later accounts. The Persian Memorial of the Saints by Attar, for example, remains one of the richest sources on Ebrahim's conversion and early life as the king of Balkh. It was through the Persian memorials that literature on Ibrahim passed into the legendary literature of India and Indonesia, where further unhistorical embellishments were added.

One of the main features of non-Arabic literature on Ibrahim is the feature of full-length biographies on the figure, as opposed to anecdotes centring on the main incidents in his life. Moreover, many of the non-Arabic accounts on Ebrahim's life preceded with a short account of the life of his father Adham. One of the most famous of these biographies was written in Persian by Rumi, which was adapted into Arabic form.
Other such biographies were written in Urdu and Malay, which laid the basis for short biographies in Javanese and Sundanese.

English poet Leigh Hunt's poem "Abou Ben Adhem" is a story of Ibrahim ibn Adham.  In turn, the musical Flahooley features a genie named Abou Ben Atom, played in the original 1951 Broadway production by Irwin Corey.

See also
 List of Sufis
 Chishti Order

 Fudhail Bin Iyadh
 Khwaja Sadid ad-Din Huzaifa al-Marashi
 Sultan Ibrahim Ibn Adham Mosque
 Beit Hanina
 Abou Ben Adhem Shrine Mosque
Abou Ben Adhem (poem)

References

Taba‘ at-Tabi‘in
Sunni Sufis
Afghan Sufis
Afghan people of Arab descent
Iranian people of Arab descent
People from Balkh
8th-century Arabs
718 births
782 deaths